Youth square dancing is square dancing among people up to their mid-twenties.  In specific contexts, e.g., in qualification for some event, it may refer to dancers up to a particular age such as 18.  It also may refer to a style of dancing that, while most popular among younger dancers, can be enjoyed by some older dancers.

Square dancing is an activity open to people of almost every age group, but many people think of it as an activity for people in their late fifties or older; in this context even people in their thirties or forties may be considered "young" dancers. But among those involved with the full age range of current dancers, early twenties is usually the upper limit for designating a group or event with the term "youth".

Clubs for youth dancers
Youth square dancing, as a style, is typically open to all square dancers. The dancing is generally modern western square dancing, as it is practiced throughout the world, standardized by Callerlab.

Square dance clubs vary in their accommodation of young dancers, ranging from clubs organized specifically for youth, through ones that are populated by dancers of every age, to some that are oriented exclusively to adults.

Some representative categories of square dance clubs and classes with respect to age:
Those for children in a specific age range (e.g., 5-8, pre-teens, teens)
Those for children and their parents or other family members
Those that encourage dancers of all ages
Those primarily oriented to adults but that allow children
Those that do not allow children

Distinctive features of youth square dancing
There are a number of ways in which youth square dancing differs from typical adult square dancing.  These features are typical in clubs that are oriented specifically toward youth dancing, and also tend to be more common, even among adults, at mixed-age clubs and events where there are a significant number of youth dancers.

Energy level
Youth dancing tends to be "higher energy".  The dancing tends to be faster, with the caller using faster and more modern music.  (Youth square dancing shares this characteristic with gay square dancing.)

Styling
While all modern Western square dancing uses a common set of call definitions, which specify the basic dance movements and outcome of each call, there are many possible "frills" or "flourishes" -- extra movements that can be added without changing the resulting position.  These include extra twirls, kicks, and other movements of the hands or feet.  A few of these are traditional among adult dancers in certain geographic regions, but youth dancing generally includes more of them regardless of location.  (Youth square dancing shares this characteristic with gay square dancing.)

Gender roles
Gender is an essential aspect of square dance choreography.  Each square consists of four "boys" (or "gentlemen") and four "girls" (or "ladies"), who maintain this identity throughout a dance tip. The caller uses this to address calls to a subset of the dancers.  In addition, a relatively small number of calls, but ones that are commonly used, involve a different dance action for the boys and girls.  However, for this to work it is not necessary that the biological sex of the dancers match the roles that they are playing at any given time, e.g., it is possible for a woman to dance the "boy's part".

At the typical adult club, dancing the "opposite part" is relatively uncommon.  Many clubs are dominated by married couples, most of the dancers are not familiar with dancing the other part, and there may even be social stigma associated with such role reversals.  Sometimes it is accepted, but is seen only as a way to deal with special circumstances, such as to accommodate everybody when there are "extra" women.

In youth dancing, switching gender roles is perhaps a little more common as a variation. It might occur because a girl does not have a partner, usually due to a shortage of boys, but wants to dance. So she partners with another girl. It's very unusual for a boy to dance the girl's part. A girl might dance the boy's part one tip, and the girl's part the next.  Some youth dancers know how to dance both parts, having learned this either for the additional challenge or out of necessity to have more flexibility in squaring up with the available dancers. (Dancing opposite roles is characteristic in challenge-level square dancing.)  Gay people also dance opposite roles, naturally.

Partners
At some adult square dance clubs (called couples clubs) and events, dancers may be expected to come with a partner, and dance mostly--in some cases exclusively-- with that partner. Although such clubs are becoming increasingly rare as the square dance population ages and couples are split by death or divorce, they may still be found.  Other clubs allow both couples and singles as members; in these, it is common for couples to dance the first and last tip together but take other partners throughout the dance.

In youth square dancing, it is very common for dancers to have a new partner for each tip, and in some cases, this is accomplished by dancers simply joining squares as individuals with other dancers then coming along to be their partners, rather than by any sort of pre-arrangement. Thus, at most clubs with a significant number of youth dancers, there is no requirement that dancers come with a partner and individual dancers are easily accommodated.  (Youth square dancing shares this characteristic with gay square dancing and challenge-level square dancing.)

Learning style
In general, younger people learn more quickly than older people, and so on average clubs with younger dancers teach a given dance program in a shorter period of time. Some groups teach youth the basics in short-format classes such as a one-week day camp or a one day "blast" class.  At some clubs, teens have been known to learn the calls by being "pulled through" sequences by their more experienced friends.

See also
Square dance club
Gay square dance
Tech Squares — a club with many college members (older members, too), which exemplifies some of the characteristics of youth square dancing.

External links
youthsquares.org - a directory of youth and youth-friendly square dance clubs
Shirts-n-Skirts - an example of a current active youth club

Square dance
Square dance